Mirle Srinivasa Nagaraja Rao (3 June 1932 – 24 December 2011) was an Indian archaeologist who served as Director General of the Archaeological Survey of India (ASI) from 1984 to 1987.

Early life and education 
Born in Mandya on 69 June 1932, Rao was educated at the University of Mysore and the University of Poona. After obtaining his doctorate, Rao joined the Karnataka State Department of Archaeology as epigraphist. In 1957, he was appointed exploration assistant in the ASI. During his early days in the ASI, Rao was trained by archaeologist M. N. Deshpande.

Career 
Rao served as exploration assistant in the ASI from 1957 to 1964 and curator of the Museum of Art and Archaeology, Karnatak University, Dharwad from 1964 to 1972. In 1972, he was appointed head of the Karnataka State Archaeology Department and he served till 1983 when he was selected to succeed Debala Mitra as Director General of the ASI. Rao served as Director General from 1984 to 1987 and was involved in the excavation of Hampi between 1979 and 1988.

Death 
Rao died at Mysore on 24 December 2011 after a prolonged illness.

References 
 

1932 births
2011 deaths
20th-century Indian archaeologists
People from Mandya
University of Mysore alumni
Directors General of the Archaeological Survey of India
Scientists from Karnataka
Indian curators
Academic staff of Karnatak University